Fatar is an Italian supplier of keyboards for digital pianos, synthesizers and organs, based in Recanati, Italy.

The company was founded by Lino Ragni in 1956. It patented its own hammer-action prototype in 1989 and introduced the conductive-rubber contact in 1990. Today, it produces both its own "Studiologic" brand of MIDI controllers, supplies keyboards for third-party manufacturers, and manufactures electronic sustain pedals.

In 2008, Fatar released the Numa keyboard controller, which was constructed entirely from acrylonitrile butadiene styrene (ABS) and allowed the user to define their own velocity curves.

References

External links
 
Studiologic Sledge Sound On Sound review (archive.org)

Musical instrument manufacturing companies of Italy
Companies based in le Marche
Electronics companies of Italy
Electronics companies established in 1956
Italian companies established in 1956
Italian brands